Fire Station No. 30, and variations, may refer to:

Fire Station No. 30–Engine Company No. 30, in the South Los Angeles area of Los Angeles, California
New York City Fire Museum, in FDNY Engine Company No. 30 (1904), Manhattan, New York City

See also
List of fire stations